Interstate 55 (I-55) is a north–south Interstate Highway that has a  section in the US state of Arkansas connecting sections in Tennessee and Missouri. The route enters Arkansas on the Memphis & Arkansas Bridge over the Mississippi River from Memphis. It travels northward through northeast Arkansas, connecting the cities of West Memphis and Blytheville. I-55 continues into Missouri heading to St. Louis, Missouri. The highway overlaps I-40 in West Memphis and has a junction with I-555, a spur route to Jonesboro, in Turrell. For the majority of its routing through Arkansas, I-55 generally follows U.S. Highway 61 (US 61).

Route description

I-55 enters Arkansas from Memphis, Tennessee, on the Memphis & Arkansas Bridge over the Mississippi River, sharing the bridge with US 61/US 64/US 70/US 79. Shortly after entering the state, the highway enters West Memphis, where US 70 exits the route and becomes Broadway Avenue. I-55/US 61/US 64/US 79 form a concurrency with I-40 at exit 5, an overlap that lasts . The highways split at I-40 exit 277, with I-40/US 79 continuing west to Little Rock and I-55/US 61/US 64 running north into Marion. US 64 exits I-55/US 61 in Marion, continuing west as Old Military Road toward Wynne. I-55 continues to run through farmlands of the Arkansas delta, paralleling Highway 77 (AR 77) until Turrell.

In Turrell, I-55/US 61 meets the southern terminus of I-555, a spur route of I-55 connecting Jonesboro to the Interstate Highway System. I-555 run north to Jonesboro, while AR 77 and US 61 become frontage roads for I-55. Slightly east of this junction, these frontage roads depart I-55, with AR 77 running near Birdsong and US 61 serving Wilson. I-55 runs northeast to enter Mississippi County, having junctions with AR 118 to Joiner, AR 181 to Bassett, AR 14 near Marie, and AR 181 near Keiser. In Osceola, the route has a junction with AR 140 near Osceola Municipal Airport. I-55 continues northeast, intersecting minor state highways in rural Mississippi County before a junction with US 61 in south Blytheville. I-55 intersects AR 18 in Blytheville before exiting town headed due north. The route has a junction with AR 150 just before crossing the Missouri state line.

Exit list

References

External links

55
 Arkansas
Transportation in Crittenden County, Arkansas
Transportation in Mississippi County, Arkansas